Stenungsund is a locality and the seat of Stenungsund Municipality, Västra Götaland County, Sweden with 9,987 inhabitants in 2010.

Overview
Stenungsund was once only an idyllic bathing and vacation location on the Swedish west coast. A landmark is the Tjörn Bridge, a bridge to the island Tjörn. Stenungsund is also home to several industries and business, with a total of 2000 registered businesses.

The annual long-distance sailing competition Tjörn Runt starts in Stenungsund.

Archaeological excavations in Stenungsund in 2006 discovered a site of Iron Age burials (1st - 3rd century AD), notable for the unusual presence of Roman ceramic artifacts.

Stenungsund was the host of the Tug-of-War championship in 2008.

History
Stenungsund holds the largest chemical cluster of its kind in Sweden, producing plastic in primary forms and basic chemicals.
The name Stenungsund comes from the village stenunge that was located where central Stenungsund now exists. Historians believe the name meant "the village at the foot of the mountain." The village had several names including Staenungum, Steffningsbyn and lastly Stännung.

Climate

Sports
The following sports clubs are located in Stenungsund:

 Stenungsunds IF
 Stenungsunds FC
 Stenungsunds IBK
 Stenungsund HF

References 

Populated places in Västra Götaland County
Populated places in Stenungsund Municipality
Municipal seats of Västra Götaland County
Swedish municipal seats
Coastal cities and towns in Sweden